Pulaski Library, also known as Hudson Branch Library, is a historic library building located at Rochester in Monroe County, New York. It was built in 1931 and is a tall one story building with a full basement and small second story office over the rear entrance foyer.  The front entrance portico is flanked by round Doric columns decorated with bosses on the column necks.  It was the second permanent library constructed by the City of Rochester.  The library was dedicated by the local Polish citizenry to General Casmir Pulaski.  It closed in 1994.

It was listed on the National Register of Historic Places in 2002.

References

Library buildings completed in 1931
Educational buildings in Rochester, New York
Libraries on the National Register of Historic Places in New York (state)
National Register of Historic Places in Rochester, New York